"It's Showtime" is a defunct kickboxing and mixed martial arts promotion based in Amsterdam, Netherlands. It was founded by Simon Rutz in 1998 and held its first show in 1999 and its last near the end of 2012.

History
It's Showtime events were cross-promoted with K-1 and other European promotions from Italy, Belgium and England. In December 2007, the first season of It’s Showtime Reality Show was broadcast on Eurosport, featuring 19 fighters from all over the world. K-1 partnership continued until K-1's deepening financial problems and Simon Rutz claimed in January 2011 that some fighters from It's Showtime had not been paid for fights in K-1.

In March 2012, It's Showtime announced that EMCOM Entertainment established the new company K-1 Global Holdings Ltd. in Hong Kong. EMCOM/K-1 Global's agreement with It's Showtime made many fighters under It's Showtime promotion sign contracts to appear in upcoming K-1 Global events. 

However, it was announced in June 2012 that It's Showtime was purchased by Glory Sports International, eventually to be merged in their new promotion GLORY.

Broadcast
It's Showtime events were usually broadcast live on Setanta Sports, JSports, TV Esporte Interativo and many others and aired on The Fight Network in Canada.

Showtime had also signed a deal with AXS TV (formerly known as HDNet) to air shows.

Rules

Kickboxing fights were conducted under K-1 rules 3 X 3 rounds and title fights 5 X 3. It's Showtime had eight different weight classes MAX 61 kg, MAX 65 kg, MAX 69 kg, MAX 73 kg, MAX 77 kg, MAX 85 kg, MAX 95 kg and Heavyweight

See also
List of It's Showtime (kickboxing) events
List of It's Showtime (kickboxing) champions
List of kickboxers

References

External links
 It's Showtime Official site

 
1998 establishments in the Netherlands
2012 disestablishments in the Netherlands
Kickboxing organizations
Mixed martial arts organizations
Mixed martial arts in the Netherlands